The Georgia Bureau of Investigation (GBI) is the state bureau of investigation of the U.S. state of Georgia. It is an independent, statewide agency that provides assistance to Georgia's criminal justice system in the areas of criminal investigations, forensic laboratory services, and computerized criminal justice information. Its headquarters is located in unincorporated DeKalb County, near Decatur and in Greater Atlanta.

Organization

The agency is divided into several parts:

 Division of Forensic Sciences (DOFS) - Established in 1952 and furnishes scientific support to the Criminal Justice System of Georgia.
 Georgia Crime Information Center (GCIC) - Established in 1973 providing round-the-clock access to needed information.
 Investigative Division - Headed by the Deputy Director for Investigations with 400 employees, working in Regional Offices, Regional Drug Enforcement Offices and other work units that provide specialized services in criminal investigations. Special agents from the Investigative Division respond to requests for assistance from local law enforcement officials to investigate major crimes such as: homicide, rape, child abuse, armed robbery, fraud and other felonies. Drug investigations can be initiated without request.
 Medical Examiner's Office - Provides forensic pathology services to 153 of 159 Georgia counties in deaths which qualify as coroner cases under the Georgia Death Investigation Act. The Chief Medical Examiner for the State of Georgia oversees the GBI's medical examiner (M.E.) program and also establishes policies and guidelines for all Georgia coroners and local medical examiners.
 Crisis Intervention Team - Assists with people with mental illness and other brain disorders.

Fleet and Asset Section manages the GBI's fleet of more than 500 vehicles and GBI assets totally nearly 5,000 items valued in excess of $100 million.

Staff Services is responsible for:

 The administration of headquarters' security personnel and maintenance contracts
 Telecommunications management
 Risk management
 Security and access management
 Contract administration.

Services
 Bingo Regulation
 Crime Statistics
 GBI Crime Statistics Database
 GAPS - Georgia Applicant Processing Service
 Georgia Criminal History Record Expungements
 Georgia Sex Offender Registry
 Law Enforcement Liaison and Links
 Non-Criminal Justice Agencies
 Obtaining Criminal History Record Information
 Prevent Child Abuse (PCA) Georgia

History
Governor Eurith D. Rivers was instrumental in the creation of the department in March 1937, when a law was passed Act 220 creating the Georgia Department of Public Safety which included the Georgia State Patrol and a plainclothes investigative division called the Division of Identification, Detection, Prevention and Investigation which became the GBI in 1940. Any crime committed on state property or on state highways came under the jurisdiction of the Department of Public Safety. The Georgia Bureau of Investigation was also authorized to assist in criminal investigations when requested to do so by local law enforcement officials or agencies.

In 1972 then Governor of Georgia Jimmy Carter proposed extensive changes in the structure of the executive branch of state government that led to the introduction of the Executive Reorganization Act. As a result of passage of this Act and later amendments, on February 28, 1974, the GBI was made an independent agency separate from the Georgia Department of Public Safety.

See also

 State bureau of investigation
 Federal Bureau of Investigation

In popular culture
The show
 Will Trent
Based on Karin Slaughter's bestselling books, the series follows Special Agent Will Trent of the Georgia Bureau of Investigations. As a child, Trent was abandoned and was forced to endure a harsh coming-of-age in Atlanta's overwhelmed foster care system. Now that he is in a position to make a difference, Trent is determined to use his unique point of view to make sure no one is abandoned like he was. His personal motivation and background contribute to Will Trent having the highest clearance rate in the GBI. Also is well know state bureau bureau of Investigation show out in world.

References

External links
Official website

1937 establishments in Georgia (U.S. state)
Government agencies established in 1937
State Bureaus of Investigation
Bureau of Investigation